Stephanie Rottier (born 22 January 1974) is a former professional Dutch tennis player.

Results
Rottier reached the second round of the 1994 French Open. She reached the final of the WTA singles tournament in Tokyo in 1993, losing to Kimiko Date in straight sets. She reached the final of the WTA doubles tournament in Beijing in 1995 partnering Wang Shi-ting, and losing to Claudia Porwik and Linda Wild, also in straight sets.

Federation Cup
Rottier played three Federation Cup singles matches for the Netherlands in 1993, winning against Maja Murić of Croatia 6–2, 6–0 and against Oksana Bushevitsa of Latvia 6–4, 6–2, before losing to Conchita Martínez of Spain in two sets.

WTA career finals

Singles: (1 runner-up)

Doubles (1 runner-up)

ITF finals

Singles: (1-4)

Doubles: (2-1)

External links

References

1974 births
Living people
Dutch female tennis players
Sportspeople from Sint-Niklaas
20th-century Dutch women
20th-century Dutch people
21st-century Dutch women